The results of the Second Periodical Review, concluded in 1969, and a subsequent interim review, concluded in 1972, of the Boundary Commission for Scotland, became effective for the February 1974 general election of the House of Commons of the Parliament of the United Kingdom (Westminster). The reviews defined 29 burgh constituencies (BCs) and 42 county constituencies (CCs), with each electing one Member of Parliament (MP) by the first past the post system of election. Therefore, Scotland had 71 parliamentary seats.

Each constituency was entirely within a county or a grouping of two or three counties, or was if the cities of Aberdeen, Dundee, Edinburgh and Glasgow are regarded as belonging, respectively to the county of Aberdeen, the county of Angus, the county of Midlothian and the county of Lanark.

February 1974 boundaries were used also in the general elections of October 1974 and 1979.

In 1975 Scottish counties were abolished under the Local Government (Scotland) Act 1973. The Third Periodical Review took account of new local government boundaries, which defined two-tier regions and districts and unitary islands council areas, and the results of the review were implemented for the 1983 general election.

Boundaries

Notes and references 

 1974
1974 establishments in Scotland
1983 disestablishments in Scotland
1974 in British politics
Constituencies of the Parliament of the United Kingdom established in 1974
Constituencies of the Parliament of the United Kingdom disestablished in 1983